Calliostoma gemmosum is a species of sea snail, a marine gastropod mollusk in the family Calliostomatidae.

Description
The size of the shell varies between 13 mm and 30 mm. The solid shell has a rather tumidly conical shape. The whorls are slopingly convex, densely strongly grained, here and there linearly engraved. The lines are obliquely minutely crenulated. The basal margin is obtusely rounded. The shell has a golden strawcolor, engraved lines chocolate-purple. It is strongly grained upon a bright golden straw-color, enlaced with engraved lines of a deep chocolate-purple.

Distribution
This species occurs in the Caribbean Sea off Venezuela and in the Atlantic Ocean off Brazil.

References

External links
 To Biodiversity Heritage Library (1 publication)
 To Encyclopedia of Life
 To World Register of Marine Species
 

gemmosum
Gastropods described in 1842